The Cheboksary constituency (No.38) is a Russian legislative constituency in the Chuvashia. Until 2007 the constituency covered Cheboksary, nearby city of Novocheboksarsk and their surroundings, however, since 2016 the constituency occupies only parts of Cheboksary and western Chuvashia.

Members elected

Election results

1993

|-
! colspan=2 style="background-color:#E9E9E9;text-align:left;vertical-align:top;" |Candidate
! style="background-color:#E9E9E9;text-align:left;vertical-align:top;" |Party
! style="background-color:#E9E9E9;text-align:right;" |Votes
! style="background-color:#E9E9E9;text-align:right;" |%
|-
|style="background-color:"|
|align=left|Nadezhda Bikalova
|align=left|Independent
|
|13.02%
|-
|style="background-color:"|
|align=left|Igor Molyakov
|align=left|Independent
| -
|12.60%
|-
| colspan="5" style="background-color:#E9E9E9;"|
|- style="font-weight:bold"
| colspan="3" style="text-align:left;" | Total
| 
| 100%
|-
| colspan="5" style="background-color:#E9E9E9;"|
|- style="font-weight:bold"
| colspan="4" |Source:
|
|}

1995

|-
! colspan=2 style="background-color:#E9E9E9;text-align:left;vertical-align:top;" |Candidate
! style="background-color:#E9E9E9;text-align:left;vertical-align:top;" |Party
! style="background-color:#E9E9E9;text-align:right;" |Votes
! style="background-color:#E9E9E9;text-align:right;" |%
|-
|style="background-color:#FF4400"|
|align=left|Svyatoslav Fyodorov
|align=left|Party of Workers' Self-Government
|
|41.03%
|-
|style="background-color:"|
|align=left|Nadezhda Bikalova (incumbent)
|align=left|Independent
|
|25.53%
|-
|style="background-color:#3A46CE"|
|align=left|Eduard Kubarev
|align=left|Democratic Choice of Russia – United Democrats
|
|4.15%
|-
|style="background-color:"|
|align=left|Vladimir Izhederov
|align=left|Independent
|
|3.90%
|-
|style="background-color:"|
|align=left|Aleksandr Shipov
|align=left|Liberal Democratic Party
|
|2.77%
|-
|style="background-color:"|
|align=left|Tatyana Petrova
|align=left|Our Home – Russia
|
|2.43%
|-
|style="background-color:#F21A29"|
|align=left|Valery Petrov
|align=left|Trade Unions and Industrialists – Union of Labour
|
|1.83%
|-
|style="background-color:"|
|align=left|Anatoly Sharapov
|align=left|Independent
|
|1.40%
|-
|style="background-color:#265BAB"|
|align=left|Alimzhan Abubikerov
|align=left|Russian Lawyers' Association
|
|1.21%
|-
|style="background-color:#DA2021"|
|align=left|Valery Bobkov
|align=left|Ivan Rybkin Bloc
|
|1.07%
|-
|style="background-color:#DD137B"|
|align=left|Vladislav Alekseyev
|align=left|Social Democrats
|
|0.94%
|-
|style="background-color:"|
|align=left|Yury Chetkov
|align=left|Independent
|
|0.91%
|-
|style="background-color:#F7C451"|
|align=left|Eduard Arlanov
|align=left|Common Cause
|
|0.80%
|-
|style="background-color:"|
|align=left|Gennady Sokolov
|align=left|Independent
|
|0.65%
|-
|style="background-color:#0D0900"|
|align=left|Valery Saperov
|align=left|People's Union
|
|0.41%
|-
|style="background-color:"|
|align=left|Galina Ruban
|align=left|Independent
|
|0.35%
|-
|style="background-color:#000000"|
|colspan=2 |against all
|
|5.49%
|-
| colspan="5" style="background-color:#E9E9E9;"|
|- style="font-weight:bold"
| colspan="3" style="text-align:left;" | Total
| 
| 100%
|-
| colspan="5" style="background-color:#E9E9E9;"|
|- style="font-weight:bold"
| colspan="4" |Source:
|
|}

1999

|-
! colspan=2 style="background-color:#E9E9E9;text-align:left;vertical-align:top;" |Candidate
! style="background-color:#E9E9E9;text-align:left;vertical-align:top;" |Party
! style="background-color:#E9E9E9;text-align:right;" |Votes
! style="background-color:#E9E9E9;text-align:right;" |%
|-
|style="background-color:"|
|align=left|Anatoly Aksakov
|align=left|Independent
|
|40.41%
|-
|style="background-color:"|
|align=left|Igor Molyakov
|align=left|Communist Party
|
|29.42%
|-
|style="background-color:"|
|align=left|Oleg Nasakin
|align=left|Liberal Democratic Party
|
|5.98%
|-
|style="background-color:"|
|align=left|Valentin Malyutkin
|align=left|Yabloko
|
|4.34%
|-
|style="background-color:#E32322"|
|align=left|Vladimir Izhederov
|align=left|Stalin Bloc – For the USSR
|
|3.42%
|-
|style="background-color:"|
|align=left|Vakhtang Chkuaseli
|align=left|Independent
|
|2.25%
|-
|style="background-color:#7C273A"|
|align=left|Vitaly Malinov
|align=left|Movement in Support of the Army
|
|1.43%
|-
|style="background-color:"|
|align=left|Vladimir Petrov
|align=left|Independent
|
|1.23%
|-
|style="background-color:"|
|align=left|Valery Mikhaylov
|align=left|Independent
|
|0.67%
|-
|style="background-color:"|
|align=left|Yury Metlov
|align=left|Independent
|
|0.29%
|-
|style="background-color:#000000"|
|colspan=2 |against all
|
|7.82%
|-
| colspan="5" style="background-color:#E9E9E9;"|
|- style="font-weight:bold"
| colspan="3" style="text-align:left;" | Total
| 
| 100%
|-
| colspan="5" style="background-color:#E9E9E9;"|
|- style="font-weight:bold"
| colspan="4" |Source:
|
|}

2003

|-
! colspan=2 style="background-color:#E9E9E9;text-align:left;vertical-align:top;" |Candidate
! style="background-color:#E9E9E9;text-align:left;vertical-align:top;" |Party
! style="background-color:#E9E9E9;text-align:right;" |Votes
! style="background-color:#E9E9E9;text-align:right;" |%
|-
|style="background-color:#FFD700"|
|align=left|Anatoly Aksakov (incumbent)
|align=left|People's Party
|
|47.32%
|-
|style="background-color:"|
|align=left|Igor Molyakov
|align=left|Communist Party
|
|24.98%
|-
|style="background-color:"|
|align=left|Vladimir Mayorov
|align=left|Independent
|
|4.79%
|-
|style="background-color:"|
|align=left|Yevgeny Lin
|align=left|Yabloko
|
|2.55%
|-
|style="background-color:#164C8C"|
|align=left|Arina Ryzhova
|align=left|United Russian Party Rus'
|
|2.50%
|-
|style="background-color:"|
|align=left|Viktor Fedorov
|align=left|Independent
|
|1.89%
|-
|style="background-color:#00A1FF"|
|align=left|Valery Zhukov
|align=left|Party of Russia's Rebirth-Russian Party of Life
|
|1.20%
|-
|style="background-color:"|
|align=left|Sergey Drandrov
|align=left|Independent
|
|1.18%
|-
|style="background-color:#000000"|
|colspan=2 |against all
|
|10.99%
|-
| colspan="5" style="background-color:#E9E9E9;"|
|- style="font-weight:bold"
| colspan="3" style="text-align:left;" | Total
| 
| 100%
|-
| colspan="5" style="background-color:#E9E9E9;"|
|- style="font-weight:bold"
| colspan="4" |Source:
|
|}

2016

|-
! colspan=2 style="background-color:#E9E9E9;text-align:left;vertical-align:top;" |Candidate
! style="background-color:#E9E9E9;text-align:leftt;vertical-align:top;" |Party
! style="background-color:#E9E9E9;text-align:right;" |Votes
! style="background-color:#E9E9E9;text-align:right;" |%
|-
|style="background-color:"|
|align=left|Leonid Cherkesov
|align=left|United Russia
|
|46.77%
|-
|style="background-color:"|
|align=left|Oleg Nikolayev
|align=left|A Just Russia
|
|11.99%
|-
|style="background-color:"|
|align=left|Valentin Shurchanov
|align=left|Communist Party
|
|11.88%
|-
|style="background-color:"|
|align=left|Sergey Belobayev
|align=left|Liberal Democratic Party
|
|7.62%
|-
|style="background-color:"|
|align=left|Sergey Shulyatyev
|align=left|Communists of Russia
|
|3.00%
|-
|style="background-color:"|
|align=left|Oleg Nikolayev
|align=left|The Greens
|
|2.82%
|-
|style="background:"| 
|align=left|Vladimir Mayorov
|align=left|People's Freedom Party
|
|1.94%
|-
|style="background-color:"|
|align=left|Oleg Nikolayev
|align=left|Independent
|
|1.84%
|-
|style="background:"| 
|align=left|Vladislav Arkadyev
|align=left|Yabloko
|
|1.70%
|-
|style="background-color:"|
|align=left|Andrey Kulagin
|align=left|Patriots of Russia
|
|1.53%
|-
|style="background:"| 
|align=left|Aleksandr Golitsyn
|align=left|Civic Platform
|
|1.30%
|-
|style="background:"| 
|align=left|Mikhail Gorbatin
|align=left|Party of Growth
|
|1.28%
|-
|style="background-color:"|
|align=left|Nina Ryleyeva
|align=left|Rodina
|
|1.21%
|-
| colspan="5" style="background-color:#E9E9E9;"|
|- style="font-weight:bold"
| colspan="3" style="text-align:left;" | Total
| 
| 100%
|-
| colspan="5" style="background-color:#E9E9E9;"|
|- style="font-weight:bold"
| colspan="4" |Source:
|
|}

2021

|-
! colspan=2 style="background-color:#E9E9E9;text-align:left;vertical-align:top;" |Candidate
! style="background-color:#E9E9E9;text-align:left;vertical-align:top;" |Party
! style="background-color:#E9E9E9;text-align:right;" |Votes
! style="background-color:#E9E9E9;text-align:right;" |%
|-
|style="background-color:"|
|align=left|Alla Salayeva
|align=left|United Russia
|
|39.63%
|-
|style="background-color:"|
|align=left|Igor Molyakov
|align=left|A Just Russia — For Truth
|
|18.36%
|-
|style="background:"| 
|align=left|Vladimir Andreyev
|align=left|Communists of Russia
|
|11.29%
|-
|style="background-color:"|
|align=left|Vladislav Tsapin
|align=left|Communist Party
|
|9.14%
|-
|style="background-color:"|
|align=left|Stanislav Pesin
|align=left|Party of Pensioners
|
|5.59%
|-
|style="background-color:"|
|align=left|Konstantin Stepanov
|align=left|Liberal Democratic Party
|
|5.52%
|-
|style="background-color:"|
|align=left|Sergey Pavlov
|align=left|Rodina
|
|2.41%
|-
|style="background:"| 
|align=left|Sergey Sorokin
|align=left|Civic Platform
|
|2.01%
|-
|style="background:"| 
|align=left|Vladislav Arkadyev
|align=left|Yabloko
|
|1.31%
|-
| colspan="5" style="background-color:#E9E9E9;"|
|- style="font-weight:bold"
| colspan="3" style="text-align:left;" | Total
| 
| 100%
|-
| colspan="5" style="background-color:#E9E9E9;"|
|- style="font-weight:bold"
| colspan="4" |Source:
|
|}

Notes

References

Russian legislative constituencies
Politics of Chuvashia